Seaholme railway station is located on the Werribee line in Victoria, Australia. It serves the western Melbourne suburb of Seaholme, and opened on 26 January 1920.

History
Seaholme station opened on 26 January 1920, on what was then the line to Altona Beach. Like the suburb itself, the station was named after a housing estate that was built in the early 1920s.

In 1954, flashing light signals were provided at the Millers Road level crossing, located at the down end of the station, with boom barriers provided in 1985. In 2020, the boom barriers were replaced with a new mechanical system and repainted into the more current red and white scheme.

During the 2016/2017 financial year, Seaholme was the fifth-least-used station on Melbourne's metropolitan network, with 103,446 passenger movements recorded.

There were two stations, Mobiltown and Williamstown Racecourse, between Seaholme and Newport, but they are now closed and demolished.

Platforms and services
Seaholme has one platform. It is served by Werribee line trains.

Platform 1:
  all stations services to Flinders Street and Frankston; all station services to Laverton (weekdays only) and Werribee

Transport links
CDC Melbourne operates two routes via Seaholme station, under contract to Public Transport Victoria:
 : Laverton station – Footscray
 : Laverton station – Footscray

References

External links
 Melway map at street-directory.com.au

Railway stations in Melbourne
Railway stations in Australia opened in 1920
Railway stations in the City of Hobsons Bay